State Route 277 (SR 277), also known as Airways Boulevard and East Parkway, is a major north-south urban state highway in Memphis, Shelby County, Tennessee.

Route description

SR 277 begins as a signed secondary highway at an intersection with Lamar Avenue (US 78/SR 4) and Airways Boulevard in the Orange Mound community and continues north as Airways. It intersects the Memphis Parkway System and turns into East Parkway. Continuing north it crosses under Union Avenue (US 70/79/64/SR 23) and picks up the former three routes, where it becomes an unsigned primary highway. Local expressway Sam Cooper Boulevard terminates along SR 277 just south of the state route's northern terminus at North Parkway (SR 1)/Summer Avenue. The U.S. routes continue east along Summer.

The state designation is not generally referred to by locals; SR 277 is generally referred to solely by the street names. The Airways Blvd section is a 4-lane undivided urban street with a 35 MPH speed limit. The majority of the East Parkway section is a 6 lane divided major urban arterial with a wide, treed median (except under the Union Avenue overpass). It carries a 40 MPH speed limit.

Major intersections

References

277
Transportation in Memphis, Tennessee
Transportation in Shelby County, Tennessee